The NCAA Division III Rowing Championship is a rowing championship held by the NCAA for Division III women's heavyweight (or openweight) collegiate crews.

Wellesley are the defending champions, winning their second national title in 2022.

The most successful program has been Williams, with nine titles.

Championship
Each championship tournament consists of eight teams, and each team is required to field two boats of eight rowers and a coxswain.

The following are the berths that are allocated: 
Pool A – four (Pool A consists of conferences that have been awarded automatic qualification): 
Liberty League
Mid-Atlantic Rowing Conference
New England Small College Athletic Conference
New England Women's and Men's Athletic Conference 
Pool B/C – four (Pools B and C include independents, institutions from conferences that do not meet automatic-qualification standards and Pool A institutions that did not receive their conference’s automatic qualification). Independents and institutions from conferences that do not meet automatic-qualification standards are:
Massachusetts Maritime Academy
D’Youville College
Sarah Lawrence College
State University of New York Maritime College
Lewis & Clark College
Mills College
Pacific University
Pacific Lutheran University
University of Puget Sound

Results

Notes
In 2005, Ithaca and Smith tied in total points for the team title, which was awarded to Ithaca based on a better overall finish in the Varsity 8+ race.
In 2006 and 2008, Williams won the team title by placing second and third in the grand final. 
In 2015, total points for team title was awarded to Bates, but Trinity won the Varsity 8+ grand final. 
In 2017, Bates again won the team title, although Williams placed first in the Varsity 8+ grand final.
In 2022, Wellesley won the team title, despite WPI winning the Varsity 8+ grand final.
 In all other years, the winner of the Varsity 8+ race also won the NCAA Division III team title.''

Event results

Varsity 8+

See also
Intercollegiate Women's Varsity Eights
Intercollegiate Rowing Association Women's Varsity Lightweight Eights Champions
NCAA Division I Rowing Championship
NCAA Division II Rowing Championship
http://www.ncaa.com/news/rowing/article/2016-05-28/wellesley-captures-its-first-division-iii-rowing-national-title

References

  3. https://www.ncaa.com/news/rowing/article/2014-05-31/trinity-conn-earns-programs-first-ncaa-national-championship

External links
NCAA Division III Rowing

Rowing
College rowing competitions in the United States
Women's rowing in the United States